Jennie Carignan  is a lieutenant-general in the Canadian Armed Forces (CAF).

Early life, education, and family 
Carignan grew up in Asbestos, Quebec, in a French-speaking household.  Growing up, the only career that she considered aside from the military was dancing as she had learned ballet, lyrical and jazz dancing since the age of eight. She joined the Canadian Armed Forces (CAF) in 1986 and studied for a degree in fuels and materials engineering from the Royal Military College Saint-Jean.  She received a commission in 1990 and served at the Canadian Forces Bases of Chilliwack and Valcartier.  Carignan married Eric Lefrançois in 1990, having met while in the same platoon at military college and taking ballroom dance classes together whilst there. He later retired from the army to look after their four children.  Two of their children, a son and a daughter, are also serving in the CAF.

Military career
Carignan served as a peacekeeper in the United Nations Disengagement Observer Force in the Golan Heights in 1993.  She was to be posted to the United Nations Protection Force in Bosnia in 1995 but had to withdraw after becoming pregnant. Carignan was promoted to major in 1999 and awarded a Master of Business Administration degree from Laval University.  She has also completed the Intermediate Learning Education (ILE) programme at the United States Army Command and General Staff College and holds the degree of Master of Military Art and Science (MMAS) from the college's School of Advanced Military Studies.  She deployed to Bosnia in 2002 to clear explosive ordnance from farmers' fields.  Carignan was deputy commanding officer and acting commander of 5 Combat Engineer Regiment from 2003 and was promoted to the rank of lieutenant-colonel in 2005.

Carignan served as an instructor at the Canadian Land Force Command and Staff College in Kingston, Ontario, before she returned to 5 Combat Engineer Regiment as commanding officer in 2008.  Between 2009 and 2010 she commanded the Task Force Kandahar Engineer Regiment in Afghanistan, being appointed deputy commander of 5 Canadian Mechanized Brigade Group upon her return.  Carignan was promoted to colonel in June 2011 and appointed chief of staff of Joint Task Force Central.  She was named one of Canada's 100 most powerful women by the Women's Executive Network in 2011. She also received the Major-General Hans Schlup Award for excellence in international relations. In July 2013, Carignan became commandant of the Royal Military College Saint-Jean and in the same year received the Hermès Award for excellence in administration. Carignan introduced sexual conduct training for all officer candidates and also reintroduced ballroom dance classes which had been discontinued in the 1990s.

Carignan was promoted to brigadier-general on 15 June 2016 and appointed chief of staff of army operations.  She was the first female Canadian general from a combat (as opposed to technical) arm.  Carignan was promoted to the rank of major-general on 15 August 2019 ahead of taking command of a training mission in Iraq. She was promoted to lieutenant-general in 2021 upon her appointment to the newly-created position of Chief for Professional Conduct and Culture, with the responsibility of preventing sexual assault in the military.

Honours and decorations 
Carignan has received the following orders and decorations during her military career:
100x100px

100x100px

100x100px

References 

Living people
Canadian generals
Canadian military engineers
Female army generals
United States Army Command and General Staff College alumni
Université Laval alumni
Royal Military College Saint-Jean alumni
Academic staff of the Royal Military College Saint-Jean
Year of birth missing (living people)